is a professional Japanese baseball player. He plays infielder for the Hiroshima Toyo Carp.

Career
Tanaka was the most valuable player of the 2016 Central League Climax Series.

He was selected . On October 10, 2018, he was selected Japan national baseball team at the 2018 MLB Japan All-Star Series.

References

External links

NPB.com

1989 births
Living people
People from Atsugi, Kanagawa
Hiroshima Toyo Carp players
Japanese baseball players
Nippon Professional Baseball second basemen
Nippon Professional Baseball shortstops
Nippon Professional Baseball third basemen
Baseball people from Kanagawa Prefecture
2017 World Baseball Classic players